Palace of Mukhrani was a seat of the princely House of Mukhrani. It is located in Mukhrani, in the eastern part of Georgia.

History

The main building was designed in 1873 by the French architects for Prince Ivane Bagration of Mukhrani. Construction of the palace took 12 years. The  gardener was invited from the Palace of Versailles.

The Mukhrani residence was an important cultural and political center for the Georgian elite of the Belle Époque. It was renovated by the TBC Bank in 2012.

The patrimony now belongs to the "Château Mukhrani" wine company.

References

1885 establishments in the Russian Empire
Houses completed in 1885
Official residences
House of Mukhrani
Palaces in Georgia (country)
Buildings and structures in Mtskheta-Mtianeti
Official residences in Europe
Belle Époque